Mahommedrasul Majidov (born 27 September 1986) is an Azerbaijani professional boxer. As an amateur he won a bronze medal at the 2012 Olympics and gold at the 2011, 2013 and 2017 World Championships, all in the super heavyweight division.

Amateur career 
At the 2011 World Amateur Boxing Championships the hard hitting Majidov stopped Uzbek Sardor Abdullayev in the round of 16 and Cuban favorite Erislandy Savon who he dropped heavily in the quarter-finals. In the semis he beat Kazakh Ivan Dychko 16:9. In the final he edged out Englishman Anthony Joshua 22:21.

At the 2012 Olympics he stopped Meji Mwamba and European champion Magomed Omarov from Russia 17:14 and looked on his way to beat defending champion Roberto Cammarelle, he was leading 8:6 after the first round but the Italian fought back to win 13:12 and Majidov won bronze.

Majidov started the 2013 AIBA World Boxing Championships with two 3-0 wins over Lenroy Thompson of the United States in the second round, and Magomed Omarov of Russia in the quarter-finals. He continued on to beat Roberto Cammarelle in the semi-finals, with a knockdown gained for Majidov in the first round from a big right hand. Despite getting a warning point, he won the bout 3-0 and advanced to the final. In the final, Ivan Dychko of Kazakhstan started brighter, winning the first two rounds on all the judges' scorecards. However, near the beginning of the third round, a knockdown soon followed by another gave Majidov the victory by knockout, and the gold medal.

Magomedrasul started the 2017 AIBA World Boxing Championships with two 5-0 wins over Satish Kumar of the India in the first round, and Hussein Ishaish of Jordan in the second round. In quarterfinals Majidov wins 3-2 Djamili-Dini Aboudou of France and semifinals he wins Joseph Goodall of Australia and advanced to the final. In the final, Magomedrasul Majidov fight Kamshybek Kunkabayev of Kazakhstan and gave the victory 4-1 and the gold medal. With this victory, he became the world champion for the third time in super heavyweight.

Professional career 
In September 2019 it was announced Majidov had signed a promotional deal with Eddie Hearn's Matchroom Boxing USA and would make his professional debut on 13 September 2019, Ed Fountain at Madison Square Garden in New York. The fight was aired live on Sky Sports in the UK and DAZN in the US as part of the undercard for Devin Haney vs. Zaur Abdullaev. Majidov won the fight via fourth-round technical knockout (TKO).

In April 2021, Majidov suffered the first defeat of his career in his fourth fight when he was stopped in the first round by Andrey Fedosov, who dropped Majidov twice despite fighting for the first time in 30 months. Majidov twisted his ankle after the first knockdown, and needed to be carried out of the ring on a stretcher with an ankle support boot on after the second.

Professional boxing record

References

External links

Living people
Sportspeople from Baku
Super-heavyweight boxers
Azerbaijani male boxers
Boxers at the 2012 Summer Olympics
Boxers at the 2016 Summer Olympics
Olympic boxers of Azerbaijan
Olympic bronze medalists for Azerbaijan
Olympic medalists in boxing
Medalists at the 2012 Summer Olympics
1986 births
AIBA World Boxing Championships medalists
Boxers at the 2015 European Games
European Games medalists in boxing
European Games bronze medalists for Azerbaijan
Islamic Solidarity Games medalists in boxing